Nuozhadu Dam is an embankment dam on the Lancang (Mekong) River in Yunnan Province in southwest China. The purpose of the dam is hydroelectric power production along with flood control and navigation. The dam supports a power station with nine generators, each with generating capacity of 650 MW. The total generating capacity of the power station is 5,850 MW. Construction on the project began in 2004; the dam's first generator went online 6 September 2012 and the last generator was commissioned in June 2014. The construction and management of the project was implemented by Huaneng Power International Ltd., which has a concession to build, own and operate hydroelectric dams on China's stretch of the Mekong River.

See also 

 List of power stations in China
 List of tallest dams in the world
 List of tallest dams in China
 List of dams and reservoirs in China

References

Zhang Zhonglan and Yuan Youren: Slope stability study and section optimization of Nuozhadu’s earth core rockfill dam, New Developments in Dam Engineering. Proceedings of the 4th International Conference on Dam Engineering, 18-20 October 2004, Nanjing, China
Nuozhadu Hydropower Project - Excavation of the Underground Powerhouse Complex

Hydroelectric power stations in Yunnan
Dams in China
Dams in the Mekong River Basin
Dams completed in 2012
2014 establishments in China
Energy infrastructure completed in 2014
China Huaneng Group
Buildings and structures in Pu'er